The Journal of Fire Sciences is a bimonthly peer-reviewed scientific journal that covers the fields of engineering and materials science as applied to fire prevention. The editor-in-chief is Alexander B. Morgan. It was established in 1983 and is published by SAGE Publications.

Abstracting and indexing 
The journal is abstracted and indexed in Scopus and the Science Citation Index Expanded. According to the Journal Citation Reports, its 2020 impact factor is 1.694, ranking it 57th out of 91 journals in the category "Engineering, Multidisciplinary" and 269th out of 334 journals in the category "Materials Science, Multidisciplinary".

References

External links 
 

SAGE Publishing academic journals
English-language journals
Engineering journals
Materials science journals
Publications established in 1983
Bimonthly journals